Ann E. Cudd is an American philosopher. She will be the President of Portland State University beginning in the 2023-2024 academic year. Until then, she is the Provost and Senior Vice Chancellor & Professor of Philosophy at the University of Pittsburgh. She was formerly Dean of the College and Graduate School of Arts & Sciences at Boston University. Before that, she was Vice Provost and Dean of Undergraduate Studies, as well as University Distinguished Professor of Philosophy, at the University of Kansas. She was also an affiliated faculty member in the Women, Gender, and Sexualities Studies Program during her time there. Cudd is considered one of the founders of analytical feminism, was a founding member of the Society for Analytical Feminism, and served as its president from 1995-1999. On March 10, 2023, Cudd was formally selected as the 11th President of Portland State University.

Education and career
Cudd received a dual baccalaureate in mathematics and philosophy from Swarthmore College in 1982 before going on to the University of Pittsburgh to receive a master's in philosophy, a master's in economics, and a doctorate in philosophy, in 1984, 1986, and 1988 respectively. After receiving her doctorate, Cudd accepted a position at Assistant Professor at the University of Kansas. She left in 1991 for a similar position at Occidental College, but returned to the University of Kansas in 1993. She was promoted to Associate Professor of Philosophy at the University of Kansas in 1994, full Professor of Philosophy in 2000, and received a secondary appointment as Director and full Professor of Gender and Women's Studies in 2001 (which she held until 2008, when she became an affiliated faculty member.)

In 2008, Cudd became the Associate Dean for Humanities for the University of Kansas, and in 2012, Cudd was named Distinguished Professor, the highest academic honor the University of Kansas bestows on faculty members. In 2013, Cudd was named Vice Provost and Dean of Undergraduate Studies.

Research areas and publications
Cudd's research has focused in several areas, namely feminist theory, the philosophy of social science, and social and political philosophy. Cudd is one of the founders of analytical feminism, a branch of feminism which seeks to apply the methods of analytical philosophy to feminist issues and topics. She's authored two books and co-edited three more: Capitalism For and Against: A Feminist Debate (coauthored with Nancy Holmstrom in 2011, Analyzing Oppression in 2006, co-edited Philosophical Perspectives on Democracy in the 21st Century with Sally Scholz in 2014, co-edited Feminist Theory: A Philosophical Anthology in 2006, and co-edited Theorizing Backlash: Philosophical Reflections on the Resistance to Feminism in 2002.  She has also written dozens of articles in peer-reviewed journals, written several encyclopedia articles, and many book reviews.

Much of Cudd's work analyzes power relationships through rational choice theory. Cudd's analysis of oppression argues that in an objective moral theory it is necessary to know whether or not harms experienced by individuals were indeed actual harms that the person shouldn't have suffered and are thus, in fact, oppressive. Cudd argues that the simple absence of good choices is not a form of coercion - for coercion to occur, objectively better choices must have been available to the subject.

Selected bibliography

Books

Chapters in books

Journal articles

References

20th-century American philosophers
21st-century American philosophers
American political philosophers
American women philosophers
Feminist philosophers
Living people
Occidental College faculty
Social philosophers
Swarthmore College alumni
Women's studies academics
University of Kansas faculty
University of Pittsburgh faculty
University of Pittsburgh alumni
Year of birth missing (living people)
20th-century American women
21st-century American women
Distinguished professors of philosophy